The 2022 East Africa T20 Series was a Twenty20 International (T20I) cricket tournament, that took place in Rwanda in December 2022. The venue for the series was the Gahanga International Cricket Stadium in Kigali. The participating teams were originally planned to be the hosts Rwanda along with Kenya, Tanzania and Uganda, with the tournament to be played as a triple round-robin. However Kenya withdrew shortly before the tournament, and the format was changed so that each team would play each other six times in a round-robin. Uganda won the tournament after defeating Tanzania on the penultimate day of the event.

Squads

Points table

Fixtures

Notes

References

External links
 Series home at ESPNcricinfo

Associate international cricket competitions in 2022–23
East Africa T20 Series